Scion Rock Fest was an annual heavy metal music festival held in various cities throughout the United States. The festival lineups included bands from several genres of metal, such as death metal, grindcore, doom metal, metalcore, and experimental metal, and booked headliners that include Cannibal Corpse, Mastodon, Morbid Angel, Down, and Sleep. The festival was produced by Scion's lifestyle marketing brand, Scion AV, and admission was free every year.  Live video recordings and band interviews were also released after each fest.

History
Scion Rock Fest was established in 2009 as part of Scion AV's involvement in the metal music genre. The five festivals that occurred since 2009 featured performances from 110 bands from all over North America, Europe, and Asia.

Venues & Lineups

2009
The first Scion Rock Fest took place on Saturday, February 28 in Atlanta, GA at The Masquerade and an outdoor stage.

2010
Scion Rock Fest 2010 took place on Saturday, March 13 at four venues in Columbus, OH.

2011
Scion Rock Fest 2011 took place on Saturday, March 5 at two venues and two outdoor stages in Pomona, CA.

2012
Scion Rock Fest 2012 took place on Saturday, June 2 at four venues in Tampa, FL.

2013
On March 6, 2013, Scion announced that the next festival would take place on June 1, 2013 in Memphis, Tennessee.   The full lineup for the 2013 festival was announced on March 26, 2013.  The 2013 festival took place at five venues on Beale Street in Memphis.

2014
The 2014 Scion Rock Fest was announced on March 13, 2014 to take place in Pomona, CA.  The full festival lineup was announced on March 25, 2014.

Controversy
In the weeks leading up to the first Scion Rock Fest in 2009, Scion removed Nachtmystium from the lineup due to alleged ties to Nazism.   The band's first album, Reign of the Malicious, was distributed via the National Socialist Black Metal record label Unholy Records.  The band was outspoken about the accusations and denied any true ties to the Nazi movement.

Several months before Scion Rock Fest 2012 and before the final lineup had been officially announced, the American sludge metal band Eyehategod announced on their Facebook page that they had been banned by Scion Audio/Visual from performing at Scion Rock Fest. Brian Patton, a guitarist in the band, later told The Age of Metal in a phone interview that Scion Audio/Visual had originally approached the band to perform at the 2012 festival, but later rescinded the offer due to their lyrical content and the religious connotations in the band's name.

External links

References

Heavy metal festivals in the United States